World Healing Day is a name used for a variety of events that have been held in hundreds of cities in over 65 nations. World Healing Day events have included Yoga, Prayer, Tai Chi, Qigong, Reiki, Healing Prayer, Meditation Day, Native Aboriginal Sacred Dance Day, Sufi Dance, Art and Music Healing.

History
The template for World Healing Day events grew from the example of World Tai Chi & Qigong Day (WTCQD) events which had been held for over a decade worldwide. WTCQD's events had been officially proclaimed by governors, senates, mayors, legislatures in most US States and in several countries.

The  WTCQD's official motto "One World ... One Breath", then became the official motto of World Healing Day as well.

External links
 WorldHealingDay.org
 UK Independent, Health & Families, 23 April 2010 - "How to meditate for World Healing Day"
 Huffington Post, 24 April 2010 - "World Yoga Day 2010 (VIDEO)"
 UK Independent, 16 April 2010 - "Weekly health and fitness agenda: FIBO 2010, World Healing Day"
 The Daily Helmsman, 21 April 2004 - "World Healing Day has Tai Chi, yoga"

April_observances